The Councils of People's Commissars (SNK; , Sovet narodnykh kommissarov), commonly known as the Sovnarkom (Совнарком), were the highest executive authorities of the Russian Soviet Federative Socialist Republic (RSFSR), the Soviet Union (USSR), and the Soviet republics from 1917 to 1946.

The Sovnarkom of the RSFSR was founded in the Russian Republic soon after the October Revolution in 1917 and its role was formalized in the 1918 Constitution of the RSFSR to be responsible to the Congress of Soviets of the RSFSR for the "general administration of the affairs of the state". Unlike its predecessor the Russian Provisional Government which had representatives of various political parties, the Sovnarkom was a government of a single party, the Bolsheviks. The Sovnarkom of the USSR and Congress of Soviets of the USSR founded in 1922 were modelled on the RSFSR system, and identical Sovnarkom bodies were founded in the Soviet republics and autonomous republics. The Sovnarkom evolved into the main executive of the government of the Soviet Union with its head, the Premier of the USSR, serving as head of government. The Sovnarkom issued decrees having the force of law when the Congress was not in session, and if these decrees were not approved at the Congress's next session, they were considered revoked. The principles of democratic centralism meant the Congress merely rubber-stamped Sovnarkom decrees at its next session.

The Sovnarkom was dissolved and transformed into the Council of Ministers in 1946.

Original People's Commissars
The first council elected by the Second All-Russian Congress of Soviets was composed as follows. Many early commisars later opposed the party majority organized by Stalin and allegedly conspired with the Trotskyist opposition or some other opposition group, which resulted in their expulsion from the party or being arrested. The party had banned factional opposition groups at the Eleventh Party Congress during 1921. Still the original People's Comissariat included Left-Communists, Trotskyists and  other ex-oppositionists. Most alleged conspirators were executed for treason during the Great Purge, some had sentences reduced to imprisonment.

All-Union Sovnarkom
Upon the creation of the USSR in 1922, the Soviet Union's government was modelled after the first Sovnarkom. The Soviet republics retained their own governments which dealt with domestic matters.

Sovmin
In 1946, the Sovnarkoms were transformed into the Council of Ministers (Sovmin) at both all-Union and Union Republic level.

Councils by administrative division
 Council of People's Commissars of the Soviet Union

Soviet republics

 Council of People's Commissars of the Russian Soviet Federative Socialist Republic
 Council of People's Commissars (Ukraine) (Temporary government of Workers and Peasants of Ukraine)
 Council of People's Commissars of Belarus, including LitBel
 Council of People's Commissars of Azerbaijan
 Council of People's Commissars (Armenia)
 Council of People's Commissars (Bukhara)
 Council of People's Commissars (Khorezm)
 Council of People's Commissars (Georgia)
 Council of People's Commissars (Turkestan)
 Council of People's Commissars (Transcaucasia)
 Council of People's Commissars (Kazakhstan), including as autonomous Kyrgyz (before 1925)
 Council of People's Commissars (Turkmenistan)
 Council of People's Commissars (Kyrgyzstan), including as autonomous Kyrgyz (after 1925)
 Council of People's Commissars (Uzbekistan)
 Council of People's Commissars (Tajikistan), including as autonomous
 Council of People's Commissars (Karelia-Finland), including as autonomous Karelia
 Council of People's Commissars (Moldova), including as autonomous
 Council of People's Commissars of the Lithuanian SSR
 Council of People's Commissars (Latvia)
 Council of People's Commissars (Estonia)

Autonomous republics
 Council of People's Commissars (Adjara)
 Council of People's Commissars (Volga German)
 Council of People's Commissars (Bashkorstan)
 Council of People's Commissars (Buryat-Mongolia)
 Council of People's Commissars (Mountainous)
 Council of People's Commissars (Dagestan)
 Council of People's Commissars (Kabardin-Balkaria), including Kabardin (1944-1957)
 Council of People's Commissars (Cossack)
 Council of People's Commissars (Kalmykia)
 Council of People's Commissars (Karakalpakistan)
 Council of People's Commissars (Komi)
 Council of People's Commissars (Crimea)
 Council of People's Commissars (Mari)
 Council of People's Commissars (Mordva)
 Council of People's Commissars (Nakhichevan)
 Council of People's Commissars (North Osetia)
 Council of People's Commissars (Tatarstan)
 Council of People's Commissars (Tuva)
 Council of People's Commissars (Udmurtia)
 Council of People's Commissars (Chechnia-Ingushetia)
 Council of People's Commissars (Chuvashia)
 Council of People's Commissars (Yakutia)
 Council of People's Commissars (Abkhazia), including as autonomous

Short-lived early soviet republics 
 Council of People's Commissars (Donetsk-Krivoi Rog)
 Council of People's Commissars (Odessa), initially as Rumcherod
 Council of People's Commissars (Poland)
 Council of People's Commissars (Galicia)
 Council of People's Commissars (Far East)
 Council of People's Secretaries (Soviet Ukraine)

See also
 26 Baku Commissars
 Government of the Soviet Union
 Deputy Premier of the Soviet Union
 First Deputy Premier of the Soviet Union
 Executive Officer of the Soviet Union
 Council of Ministers
 Cabinet of Ministers

References

External links
 Governments of the Union of Soviet Socialist Republics from 1917–1964 and 1964–1991
 Lenin as Head of Government, an English-language Soviet book on Lenin's activities as Chairman of the Council of People's Commissars

Government of Russia
Russian Soviet Federative Socialist Republic
1917 establishments in Russia
1946 disestablishments in the Soviet Union
Government agencies established in 1917
Government agencies disestablished in 1946